Angustibacter is a genus of bacteria from the family Kineosporiaceae.

References

Actinomycetia
Bacteria genera